Abacetus quadratipennis is a species of ground beetle in the subfamily Pterostichinae. It was described by W.J.Macleay in 1888.

References

quadratipennis
Beetles described in 1888